is a 2000 Japanese film directed by Katsuhide Motoki.

Cast 
 Toshiyuki Nishida : Hamada Densuke
 Rentaro Mikuni : Suzuki Ichinosuke
 Miyoko Asada : Mamada Michiko
 Tomoko Naraoka : Suzuki
 Takehiro Murata : Usami Goro
 Kei Tani : Sasaki Kazuo
 Akira Onodera : Kawashima
 Takashi Sasano : Maebara
Toshio Shiba : Haraguchi
 Sachiko Sakurai : Isomura Shino

References

External links
 

Live-action films based on manga
Films directed by Katsuhide Motoki
Tsuribaka Nisshi
Films set in Okinawa Prefecture
2000s Japanese-language films
2000s Japanese films